Milan Ristovski (Macedonian: Милан Ристовски; born 8 April 1998) is a Macedonian footballer who plays for Spartak Trnava as a forward.

Club career
Ristovski began his career with his hometown club Rabotnički Skopje where he made his professional debut, age 16, on 22 November 2014. In February 2017 he was loaned to Rijeka in Croatia until June 2017, where he joined his older brother Stefan. In July 2017, he was once again loaned to Rijeka with a buying option, this time for the entire season. He made his Rijeka debut on 10 December 2017, when he came on as a substitution in the Croatian First Football League match against Slaven Belupo.

After half-season loan with the club, in July 2021, he signed with Spartak Trnava on a three-year contract. Ristovski became the club's most expensive arrival, arriving from Rijeka for a further undisclosed sum.

International career
Ristovski was capped for North Macedonia's under-17, under-19, and under-21 national teams.

He made his debut for North Macedonia national football team on 4 June 2021 in a friendly against Kazakshtan and scored his team's third goal in a 4–0 victory.

International

International goals
''As of match played 2 June 2022. North Macedonia score listed first, score column indicates score after each Ristovski goal.

Personal life
His older brother Stefan is also a professional footballer who plays for Dinamo Zagreb and North Macedonia national team. Ristovski speaks Slovak fluently. He is a Christian.

Honours

Rijeka
 Croatian Cup: 2018–19

Spartak Trnava
Slovak Cup: 2021–22

References

External links

1998 births
Living people
Footballers from Skopje
Association football midfielders
Macedonian footballers
North Macedonia youth international footballers
North Macedonia under-21 international footballers
North Macedonia international footballers
Macedonian Christians
FK Rabotnički players
HNK Rijeka players
NK Krško players
FC Nitra players
FC Spartak Trnava players
Macedonian First Football League players
Croatian Football League players
Slovenian PrvaLiga players
Slovak Super Liga players
UEFA Euro 2020 players
Macedonian expatriate footballers
Expatriate footballers in Croatia
Macedonian expatriate sportspeople in Croatia
Expatriate footballers in Slovenia
Macedonian expatriate sportspeople in Slovenia
Expatriate footballers in Slovakia
Macedonian expatriate sportspeople in Slovakia